Ihwa-dong may refer to one of the dong, or neighborhood in cities of South Korea.

Ihwa-dong in Jongno-gu, Seoul
Ihwa-dong in Gyeyang-gu, Incheon